Dash Bolagh (also Romanized as Dāsh Bolāgh) is a village in Ojarud-e Gharbi Rural District, in the Central District of Germi County, Ardabil Province, Iran. At the 2006 census, its population was 49, in 12 families.

References 

Towns and villages in Germi County